Robert Nisbet (1913–1996) was conservative American sociologist.

Robert Nisbet may also refer to:

 Robert Nisbet (sea captain) (1834–1917), Shetland sea captain
 Robert Nisbet (journalist) (born 1968), British former journalist, now working as Regional Director for the Rail Delivery Group
 Robert Nisbet (minister) (1814–1874), Scottish minister of the Church of Scotland and religious author
 Robert Nisbet (rower) (1900–1986), British rower
 Robert Parry Nisbet (1793–1882), British sheriff and member of parliament
 Bob Nisbet (born 1936), Australian footballer
 Robin Nisbet (1925–2013), Professor of Latin Literature